Protomyctophum thompsoni is a species of lanternfish.

References

Lampanyctus
Fish described in 1944